Toveh Sorkhak-e Olya (also Romanized as Toveh Sorkhak-e ‘Olyā; also known as Tovasorkhak-e ‘Olyā, Toveh Sorkhak, Toveh Sorkhak-e ‘Olyā Bar Āftāb, Toveh-ye Sorkhak, Tua Sarkhak, Tū Sorkhak-e Ḩajj Valī, Tuvehsorkhak, Tū-ye Sari Khak, Tu yi Sār-i-Khāk, Zanganeh, and Zangeneh) is a village in Homeyl Rural District, Homeyl District, Eslamabad-e Gharb County, Kermanshah Province, Iran. At the 2006 census, its population was 195, in 38 families.

References 

Populated places in Eslamabad-e Gharb County